William W. Wheeler III (born May 11, 1974) is an American politician and attorney. He is a member of the South Carolina House of Representatives from the 50th District, serving since 2016. He is a member of the Democratic party.

References

Living people
1974 births
Democratic Party members of the South Carolina House of Representatives
21st-century American politicians
University of South Carolina alumni